Ilue is a Lower Cross River language of Nigeria. Another name for Ilue is Idua.

References

Lower Cross River languages
Languages of Nigeria
Oron languages